Luke Bain (born 4 October 2000) is a Scotland international rugby league footballer who plays as a  and  for the Parramatta Eels in the NSW Cup.

Background
Bain was born in Concord, New Hampshire, USA. He is of Scottish descent.

Playing career

Club career
Bain played in 8 games, and scored 1 try for the Parramatta Eels in the 2022 NSW Cup.

International career
In 2022 Bain was named in the Scotland squad for the 2021 Rugby League World Cup.

References

External links
Mackay Cutters profile
Scotland profile
Scotland RL profile

2000 births
Living people
American rugby league players
American people of Scottish descent
Rugby league second-rows
Rugby league locks
Scotland national rugby league team players